is a Japanese rally driver.

Career
Masuoka's most notable achievement was his back-to-back successes in the Dakar Rally in 2002 and 2003, only the fourth driver in the event's history to win in consecutive years. He was also victorious in the 2003 Baja Italy and the 2004 UAE Desert Challenge.

Throughout his career he has been employed as a works driver by Mitsubishi, typically driving a Pajero. The 2009 Dakar Rally was his 21st and final participation in the rally, after which he retired along with Mitsubishi's withdrawal from the event. During his Dakar career, he won 25 stages, putting him fifth in the all-time list for the car category. He is now Senior Expert of Mitsubishi's Public Relations Department.

Personal life
Masuoka currently resides in Iruma, Saitama Prefecture, with his wife Chiaki and son Shoichiro.

Dakar Rally results

References

External links

1960 births
Japanese rally drivers
Living people
Mitsubishi Motors people
Off-road racing drivers
People from Iruma, Saitama
Dakar Rally drivers
Dakar Rally winning drivers
20th-century Japanese people